Archontophoenix purpurea, the Mount Lewis king palm, is a palm native to Queensland, Australia. It is mainly found in the rainforest.

References 

purpurea
Palms of Australia
Flora of Queensland
Plants described in 1994
Taxa named by John Leslie Dowe